Sybil (titled Walk On By in the UK) is the second studio album by American singer Sybil, released in 1989. Five singles were released from the album; "Can't Wait (On Tomorrow)", which had been released as a standalone single in 1988, and two cover versions of the Burt Bacharach and Hal David-written Dionne Warwick songs "Don't Make Me Over" and "Walk On By", which were both released as singles in 1989 and 1990 respectively. These two singles became Sybil's first real big hits worldwide, and were followed by "Crazy for You" (featuring Salt-N-Pepa) and a cover of Michael Jackson's "I Wanna Be Where You Are".

The album itself became Sybil's biggest hit in North America, being her only album to enter the Billboard 200. It achieved its biggest sales in New Zealand, where "Don't Make Me Over" hit number one, and the album peaked at No. 3. "Don't Make Me Over" had been first released on Sybil's previous album Let Yourself Go, but had not been released as a single. The song "Love's Calling", which includes a sample of Grace Jones' "Don't Cry – It's Only the Rhythm" was later included, in a new remix, on Sybil's 1993 album Doin' It Now!.

Track listing

Charts

References

External links
 Sybil at Amazon.com
Sybil at Discogs

1989 albums
Sybil (singer) albums
Pete Waterman Entertainment albums